Simon Charles Willis (born 19 March 1974) is an English former professional cricketer. A wicket-keeper, he enjoyed a seven-year career with Kent County Cricket Club, before moving into a variety of coaching roles at the club.

Willis was appointed head coach of the Hong Kong national cricket team in March 2023.

References

External links

Living people
1974 births
People from Greenwich
English cricketers
Kent cricketers
English cricket coaches
Wicket-keepers
Coaches of the Hong Kong national cricket team